The following buildings were added to the National Register of Historic Places as part of the Punta Gorda Multiple Property Submission (or MPS).

Notes

 Punta Gorda
National Register of Historic Places Multiple Property Submissions in Florida
Punta Gorda, Florida